Wang Songtao (born 28 December 1985) is a Chinese cross-country skier. He competed in the men's 15 kilometre classical event at the 2006 Winter Olympics.

References

1985 births
Living people
Chinese male cross-country skiers
Olympic cross-country skiers of China
Cross-country skiers at the 2006 Winter Olympics
Place of birth missing (living people)
Asian Games medalists in cross-country skiing
Cross-country skiers at the 2007 Asian Winter Games
Medalists at the 2007 Asian Winter Games
Asian Games bronze medalists for China